The 2010 Wimbledon Championships was a tennis tournament played on grass courts at the All England Lawn Tennis and Croquet Club in Wimbledon, London in the United Kingdom. It was the 124th edition of the Wimbledon Championships and were held from 21 June to 4 July 2010. It was the third Grand Slam tennis event of the year. The Queen of the United Kingdom, Elizabeth II attended on Thursday 24 June 2010, for the first time in more than 30 years.

Roger Federer was the defending men's champion and first seed (was actually ranked 2nd), but he was defeated in the quarterfinals by Tomáš Berdych. Berdych also defeated third seed Novak Djokovic in the semi-finals, but was defeated in straight sets by Rafael Nadal in the final. Nadal won his second Wimbledon title, having previously won the 2008 title. Serena Williams successfully defended the women's crown, defeating Vera Zvonareva in the final to win her fourth Wimbledon title.

Point and prize money distribution

Point distribution
Below are the tables with the point distribution for each discipline of the tournament.

Prize money
The total prize money for 2010 championships was £13,725. The winner of the men's and women's singles title earned £1,000,000.

* per team

Champions

Seniors

Men's singles

 Rafael Nadal def.  Tomáš Berdych, 6–3, 7–5, 6–4
It was Nadal's fifth title of the year and 41st of his career. It was his 8th Grand Slam title and second at Wimbledon, also winning in 2008.

Women's singles

 Serena Williams def.  Vera Zvonareva, 6–3, 6–2
This was Williams' second title of the year and 37th of her career. The title was Williams' 4th Wimbledon title and 13th major victory which ranked her 6th all-time.

Men's doubles

 Jürgen Melzer /  Philipp Petzschner def.  Robert Lindstedt /  Horia Tecău, 6–1, 7–5, 7–5
It was the first title for both Melzer and Petzschner.

Women's doubles

 Vania King /  Yaroslava Shvedova def.  Elena Vesnina /  Vera Zvonareva, 7–6(8–6), 6–2
It was King and Shvedova's third tournament as a team, and their first title together.

Mixed doubles

 Leander Paes /  Cara Black def.  Wesley Moodie /  Lisa Raymond, 6–4, 7–6(7–5)

Juniors

Boys' singles

 Márton Fucsovics def.  Benjamin Mitchell, 6–4, 6–4

Girls' singles

 Kristýna Plíšková def.  Sachie Ishizu, 6–3, 4–6, 6–4

Boys' doubles

 Liam Broady /  Tom Farquharson def.  Lewis Burton /  George Morgan, 7–6(7–4), 6–4

Girls' doubles

 Tímea Babos /  Sloane Stephens def.  Irina Khromacheva /  Elina Svitolina, 6–7(7–9), 6–2, 6–2

Invitation

Gentlemen's invitation doubles

 Donald Johnson /  Jared Palmer def.  Wayne Ferreira /  Yevgeny Kafelnikov, 6–3, 6–2

Ladies' invitation doubles

 Martina Navratilova /  Jana Novotná def.  Tracy Austin /  Kathy Rinaldi, 7–5, 6–0

Senior gentlemen's invitation doubles

 Pat Cash /  Mark Woodforde def.  Jeremy Bates /  Anders Järryd, 6–2, 7–6(7–5)

Wheelchair events

Wheelchair men's doubles

 Robin Ammerlaan /  Stefan Olsson def.  Stéphane Houdet /  Shingo Kunieda, 6–4, 7–6(7–4)

Wheelchair women's doubles

 Esther Vergeer /  Sharon Walraven def.  Daniela Di Toro /  Lucy Shuker, 6–2, 6–3

Events

Isner–Mahut match

In a record-setting match spanning three days, 23rd seed John Isner, attempting to win his first ever match at Wimbledon, faced off against qualifier Nicolas Mahut in the first round, between 22 and 24 June. With the score at 6–4, 3–6, 6–7(7), 7–6(3), 59–59, the match was suspended due to failing daylight for the second straight day, after a total of 9 hours and 58 minutes of play. Isner had already served a world record 98 aces by that time, with Mahut scoring 94 aces, both breaking Ivo Karlović's previous record of 78. The second day's play alone totalled 7 hours and 8 minutes, more than the longest previous complete match, therefore also making it the longest session of tennis ever played in a single day. Isner eventually defeated Mahut 6–4, 3–6, 6–7(7), 7–6(3), 70–68. The match lasted 11 hours and 5 minutes in total, and the fifth set alone lasted 8 hours and 11 minutes.

The match has been noted as officially the longest match ever in a tennis Open in terms of both times and games, beating the previous records set (respectively) by the match between Frenchmen Fabrice Santoro and Arnaud Clément at the 2004 French Open, which lasted for 6 hours and 33 minutes, and the first round match at Wimbledon in 1969 where Pancho Gonzales defeated Charlie Pasarell in 112 games (before the introduction of the tie-break). Time magazine named the Isner–Mahut match one of the Top 10 Sports Moments of 2010.

Queen visits Wimbledon
Queen Elizabeth II visited Wimbledon on Thursday 24 June, her first visit to the annual tennis tournament in 33 years. The last time the Queen had attended the championships was in 1977, when she watched British player Virginia Wade win the ladies' singles title. Arriving shortly after 11 am, the Queen's visit included a tour of the grounds and an observation session of the All England Club's Wimbledon Junior Tennis Initiative on Court 14, before moving to the Members' Lawn where she greeted a line-up of players: the defending champions in singles Serena Williams and Roger Federer, multiple-time Wimbledon champions Martina Navratilova, Billie Jean King and Venus Williams, and a selection of top professionals: Caroline Wozniacki, Jelena Janković, Novak Djokovic and Andy Roddick. She also met four British women's tennis players: Heather Watson, Elena Baltacha, Anne Keothavong and Laura Robson. Following that, she walked across the bridge to Centre Court, where she later had lunch in the Clubhouse with a selection of former and current tennis players.

The Queen finished her visit by watching Britain's fourth seed Andy Murray play Jarkko Nieminen on Centre Court, from the Royal Box. Before and after the match, Murray and Nieminen bowed to the Royal Box, a tradition that had previously not been in use since 2003.

Records
In addition to all the records set during the match between John Isner and Nicolas Mahut, the following records were also established:
Novak Djokovic's first-round match against Olivier Rochus was the latest-ever finish at Wimbledon, ending at 22:58, two minutes before the 23:00 curfew. Djokovic won the match 4–6, 6–2, 3–6, 6–4, 6–2.
In a second-round match against Djokovic, Taylor Dent broke the serve speed record at Wimbledon, at 148 mph (beating the record set by Andy Roddick at 146 mph in 2009). Djokovic won the match 7–6(7–5), 6–1, 6–4.
Serena Williams recorded the most aces served by a female at a Grand Slam, with 89 aces.

Singles players
Gentlemen's singles

Ladies' singles

Day-by-day summaries

Singles seeds
The following are the seeded players and notable players who withdrew from the event. Seedings based on ATP and WTA rankings as of 14 June 2010. Rankings and points before are as of 21 June 2010.

Men's singles
The Men's singles seeds is arranged on a surface-based system to reflect more accurately the individual player's grass court achievement as per the following formula:
ESP points as at a week before The Championships
Add 100% points earned for all grass court tournaments in the past 12 months
add 75% points earned for best grass court tournament in the 12 months before that.

†The player did not qualify for the tournament in 2009. Accordingly, this was the 18th best result deducted instead.

The following players would have been seeded, but they withdrew from the event.

Women's singles
For the Women's singles seeds, the seeding order follows the ranking list, except where in the opinion of the Committee, the grass court credentials of a particular player necessitates a change in the interest of achieving a balanced draw.

†The player did not qualify the tournament in 2009. Accordingly, this was the 16th best result deducted instead.

The following player would have been seeded, but she withdrew from the event.

Main draw wild card entries
The following players received wild cards into the main draw senior events.

Men's singles
  Jamie Baker
  Teymuraz Gabashvili
  Nicolas Kiefer
  Andrey Kuznetsov
  Kei Nishikori

Women's singles
  Noppawan Lertcheewakarn
  Katie O'Brien
  Alison Riske
  Laura Robson
  Chanelle Scheepers
  Melanie South
  Heather Watson

Men's doubles
  Alex Bogdanovic  /  Alexander Slabinsky
  Jamie Delgado /  Josh Goodall
  Chris Eaton /  Dominic Inglot
  Jonathan Marray  /  Jamie Murray

Women's doubles
  Naomi Broady  /  Katie O'Brien
  Naomi Cavaday /  Anna Smith
  Anne Keothavong /  Melanie South
  Sally Peers /  Laura Robson

Mixed doubles
  Bob Bryan /  Lindsay Davenport
  Colin Fleming /  Sarah Borwell
  Ross Hutchins /  Anne Keothavong
  Jonathan Marray /  Anna Smith
  Jamie Murray /  Laura Robson

Protected ranking
The following players were accepted directly into the main draw using a protected ranking: 

Men's Singles
  Máximo González
  Robin Haase
  Dmitry Tursunov
  Kristof Vliegen

Women's Singles
  Casey Dellacqua

Qualifiers entries
Below are the lists of the qualifiers entering in the main draws.

Men's singles

Men's singles qualifiers
  Taylor Dent
  Martin Fischer
  Ilija Bozoljac
  Carsten Ball
  Rik de Voest
  Ivan Dodig
  Guillermo Alcaide
  Bernard Tomic
  Tobias Kamke
  Jesse Huta Galung
  Marsel İlhan
  Robert Kendrick
  Nicolas Mahut
  Brendan Evans
  Jesse Witten
  Ričardas Berankis

Lucky losers
  Jesse Levine
  Ryan Sweeting
  Stefan Koubek
  Go Soeda
  Julian Reister
  Santiago Ventura Bertomeu
  Ramón Delgado

Women's singles

Women's singles qualifiers
  Kaia Kanepi
  Nuria Llagostera Vives
  Romina Oprandi
  Bethanie Mattek-Sands
  Shenay Perry
  Anastasiya Yakimova
  Gréta Arn
  Mirjana Lučić
  Kurumi Nara
  Monica Niculescu
  Andrea Hlaváčková
  Eleni Daniilidou

Lucky losers
  Stéphanie Dubois
  Anastasia Pivovarova

Men's doubles

Men's doubles qualifiers
  Somdev Devvarman /  Treat Huey
  Rik de Voest /  Mischa Zverev
  Jesse Levine /  Ryan Sweeting
  Ilija Bozoljac /  Harsh Mankad

Lucky losers
  Tomasz Bednarek /  Mateusz Kowalczyk
  Sanchai Ratiwatana /  Sonchat Ratiwatana

Women's doubles

Women's doubles qualifiers
  Mariya Koryttseva /  Darya Kustova
  Eleni Daniilidou /  Jasmin Wöhr
  Kaia Kanepi /  Zhang Shuai
  Jill Craybas /  Marina Erakovic

Lucky losers
  Katalin Marosi /  Kathrin Wörle
  Chang Kai-chen /  Ayumi Morita

Withdrawals 
The following players were accepted directly into the main tournament, but withdrew with injuries or personal reasons.

Men's singles
Before the tournament
  Mario Ančić → replaced by  Julian Reister
  Pablo Cuevas → replaced by  Jesse Levine
  Juan Martín del Potro → replaced by  Robby Ginepri
  Richard Gasquet → replaced by  Ryan Sweeting
  Fernando González → replaced by  Frederico Gil
  Ernests Gulbis → replaced by  Santiago Ventura Bertomeu
  Tommy Haas → replaced by  Dustin Brown
  Ivo Karlović → replaced by  Stefan Koubek
  Juan Mónaco → replaced by  Óscar Hernández
  David Nalbandian → replaced by  Ramón Delgado
  Radek Štěpánek → replaced by  Go Soeda
During the tournament
  Illya Marchenko

Women's singles
Before the tournament
  Elena Dementieva → replaced by  Maria Elena Camerin
  Sabine Lisicki → replaced by  Varvara Lepchenko
  María José Martínez Sánchez → replaced by  Anastasia Pivovarova
  Peng Shuai → replaced by  Karolina Šprem
  Virginie Razzano → replaced by  Michelle Larcher de Brito
  Dinara Safina → replaced by  Stéphanie Dubois
  Carla Suárez Navarro → replaced by  Jarmila Groth

Media coverage
These are the Wimbledon television broadcasters:
 Asia: Star Sports, Star Cricket (Star Sports were also showing 2010 FIFA World Cup matches, so Star Cricket showed some Live Wimbledon coverage)
Europe:
 Albania: Supersport, M Ryci Ltd
 Austria: ORF
 Belgium: RTBF, VRT
 Bosnia and Herzegovina: Sport Klub, BHRT
 Bulgaria: Diema Vision Plc, TV Sedem JSC, TV7
 Croatia: HRT
 Czech Republic: Nova Sport
 Denmark: TV2 Sport
 France: Canal+
 Germany: Sky, SPORT1
 Greece: Nova Sports
 Hungary: Sport 1, Sport 2
 Ireland: TG4
 Italy: Sky Sport Italy
 Kosovo:Kohavision
 Lithuania: Sport 1
 Macedonia: Sport Klub
 Malta: Go Multiplus
 Montenegro: Sport Klub, TV In, B92
 Netherlands: NOS, SBS, Sport 1, Utd Football Broadcasting
 Norway: Canal+
 Poland: Polsat
 Portugal: Sport TV
 Romania: MPI / Sport Radio TV, Sport.ro
 Russia: NTV Plus
 Serbia: Sport Klub, B92
 Slovakia: Nova Sport
 Slovenia: Sport Klub
 Spain: Canal+
 Sweden: TV4
 Switzerland: SRG-SSR, SSR TV
 Turkey: NTV Spor
 United Kingdom: BBC
 Israel: Sport 5, Sport 5+, 5+ Live, Sport 5 HD
 United States: NBC, ESPN, Tennis Channel, DirecTV Experience
 Canada: RDS, TSN, Global
 Brazil: SporTV
 Australia: Nine Network, Fox Sports
 Hong Kong: ATV
 Japan: Wowow, NHK, Gaora
 Malaysia: Star Sports
 Venezuela: Meridiano
 Nigeria: NRK
 Middle East: Jsc Sports
 New Zealand: Sky Sport, TVNZ
 South Africa: Supersport
 Fiji: Fiji TV

References

External links

 Official Wimbledon Championships website
2010 Wimbledon Official website archived

 
Wimbledon Championships
Wimbledon Championships
Wimbledon Championships
Wimbledon Championships